Every Night the Same Dream is the fourth studio album by Australian indie pop band Ball Park Music. The album was released on 19 August 2016. The album peaked at number 3 on the ARIA Charts.

Reception
Zanda Wilson from Music Feeds said "Every Night the Same Dream is easily Ball Park Music's biggest achievement to date. It's full of rich feeling. It's unpredictable, it's explorative and you're left not knowing whether you're going to get pop, psych, ballad, acoustic rock or grungy bass next."
Margy Noble from The AU Review gave the album 8.2 out of 10 saying "Every Night the Same Dream isn't a recurring nightmare, nor is it a dreamless sleep. It's an unpredictable, heartfelt LP, where you'll fall between progressive psych-rock jams, indie rock and pop ballads, succumbing to the reverie of what might just be Ball Park Music's best album yet."

Track listing

Personnel 
Musicians

 Sam Cromack – lead vocals, lead guitar, writing
 Jennifer Boyce – backing vocals, bass guitar, writing
 Daniel Hanson – drums, writing
 Dean Hanson – rhythm guitar, bass guitar, writing
 Paul Furness – string arrangements, writing
 Daniel Lopez – violin
 Eleanor Streatfeild – cello

Additional personnel

 Matt Redlich – producer, mixing, recording, engineering
 Alex Bennett – engineer
 Sam Cromack – producer, recording
 William Bowden – mastering
 Polly Bass Boost – art direction, paintings
 Stuart McConaghy – paintings
 Dean Hansin – photography
 Dave Homer – layout, design

Charts

References

2016 albums
Ball Park Music albums